Philip Jonathan Morgan (born 18 December 1974) is an English former professional footballer who played as a goalkeeper.

Career
Morgan was born in Stoke-on-Trent and began his career with Premier League side Ipswich Town signing a Youth Training Scheme in 1990. He played one league match for Ipswich which came in a 2–0 defeat against Leicester City towards the end of the 1994–95 season with the side already relegated. He returned to his home city at the end of the campaign and joined Stoke City. He failed to break into the first team at Stoke and spent time out on loan at Chesterfield, Hednesford Town and three spells at Macclesfield Town. He went on to play for non-league sides Hednesford Town and Southport.

Career statistics
Source:

References

1974 births
Living people
English footballers
Association football goalkeepers
Premier League players
Ipswich Town F.C. players
Stoke City F.C. players
Macclesfield Town F.C. players
Chesterfield F.C. players
Halifax Town A.F.C. players
Hednesford Town F.C. players
Southport F.C. players
English Football League players
National League (English football) players